Chile at the Pan American Games.

Medal count 

To sort the tables by host city, total medal count, or any other column, click on the  icon next to the column title.

Summer

Winter

Medals by sport 1951-2019

References

See also